Samuel O'Flaherty (1895 – 22 May 1930) was an Irish Sinn Féin politician. He first stood for election at the 1918 general election as a Sinn Féin candidate for the Donegal East constituency but was defeated by Edward Kelly of the Irish Parliamentary Party. An electoral pact was brokered by Cardinal Michael Logue under which eight seats in northern Ireland were allocated either to the Irish Parliamentary Party or to Sinn Féin and not contested by the other. In the election Kelly obtained 7,596 votes to the Unionist's 4,797. O'Flaherty, the unofficial Sinn Féin candidate broke the pact but obtained a mere 46 votes.

He was elected unopposed as a Sinn Féin Teachta Dála (TD) to the 2nd Dáil at the 1921 elections for the Donegal constituency. He opposed the Anglo-Irish Treaty and voted against it. He was re-elected unopposed as an anti-Treaty Sinn Féin TD at the 1922 general election but did not take his seat. He lost his seat at the 1923 general election.

O'Flaherty was the son of James O'Flaherty, a farmer and mill-owner of Castlefin. His brothers were similarly involved with the Sinn Fein: John who was interned at Curragh; James, a priest and professor at Dungannon College; and Manus, a civil servant; his three sisters all belonged to Cumann na mBan.

He died from Bright's disease in Stranorlar aged 35 on 22 May 1930.

References

External links
 

1895 births
1930 deaths
Early Sinn Féin TDs
Members of the 2nd Dáil
Members of the 3rd Dáil
Politicians from County Donegal
People of the Irish Civil War (Anti-Treaty side)
Sinn Féin parliamentary candidates
People educated at St Columb's College
Alumni of University College Dublin